Pachnoda tridentata is a species of beetle from the genus Pachnoda. The species was first described in 1789.

References

Cetoniinae
Beetles described in 1789